Häggenschwil-Winden railway station is a railway station in Egnach, in the Swiss canton of Thurgau. The station sits just over the border from the Canton of St. Gallen, and its name comes from the St. Gallen municipality of Häggenschwil and village of Winden in Egnach. It is an intermediate stop on the Bodensee–Toggenburg line and is served by local trains only.

Services 
Häggenschwil-Winden is served by the S1 of the St. Gallen S-Bahn:

 : half-hourly service between Schaffhausen and Wil via St. Gallen.

References

External links 
 
 

Railway stations in the canton of Thurgau
Südostbahn stations